Tom Grady (born May 14, 1958) is an American politician.

Grady served as a Representative in the House of Representatives of the U.S. state of Florida. He attended Florida State University and graduated with a finance degree in 1979. He then went on to Law School at Duke University and graduated with his Juris Doctor in 1982. Grady lives in Naples, Florida with his family.

External links
 Official Profile

Duke University School of Law alumni
Florida State University alumni
Republican Party members of the Florida House of Representatives
1958 births
Living people